Deer Park is a city in Spokane County, Washington. The population was 3,652 at the time of the 2010 census, up from 3,017 in 2000.

History

North of Spokane, the city of Deer Park was officially incorporated  on June 24, 1908. Deer Park got its name when railroad surveyors saw deer grazing in the area. It was settled in 1889 when a railroad siding was built for the Spokane Falls & Northern Railway. Soon the Standard Lumber Company sawmill was established by William Short and George Crawford to provide the lumber needed to rebuild the nearby city of Spokane Falls (later renamed Spokane) following the great fire of 1889. By 1900 the population of Deer Park was approximately 300 residents. In addition to the sawmill, the community consisted of three general stores (owned separately by P. Kelly, Dan Weis, and A. Baldwin), a blacksmith and harness shop, a livery and feed stable, Jeff Moore's hotel, Dr. Prince's drug store, a public school with approximately 75 students, and a Congregational church led by Rev. F. McConaughy. By this time there were as many as eight sawmills within ten miles of Deer Park, all of which got their supplies in, and employed residents of, the town.

Arcadia Apple Orchards Company was established around 1906, and orchards of apple trees were planted on the land surrounding Deer Park which had been cleared by the logging activity.

During the early 1960s, an Atlas missile site (567-1) near the airport was operated by the 567th Strategic Missile Squadron of Fairchild AFB. Soon obsolete, the site was decommissioned in 1965 and sold for salvage in 1967.

Community events
Deer Park has a number of annual events throughout the year sponsored by local businesses and the city. These include:

Settlers Days, an annual fair and parade, takes place on the 4th weekend in July.

The city hosts a Summer Concert Series in Mix Park Saturday nights through the summer, with the exception of Settler's Day or if it July 4 is on a Saturday.

The annual Kiwanis Pet Parade, a parade with local people's pets, is held in July.

An annual citywide yard sale on the first weekend of August.

Roundabout 5k, a 5k footrace in September.

Winterfest, an annual winter celebration takes place in January, along with the Frostbite 5k.

Pumpkin Lane, a trick or treating event hosted by local businesses is held the Saturday Before Halloween.

Geography

Climate
According to the Köppen Climate Classification system, Deer Park has a Dry-summer continental climate, abbreviated "Dsb" on climate maps.

Demographics

2010 census
As of the census of 2010, there were 3,652 people, 1,394 households, and 948 families living in the city. The racial makeup of the city was 92.6% White, 0.4% African American, 1.5% Native American, 0.2% Asian, 0.3% Pacific Islander, 1.2% from other races, and 3.9% from two or more races. Hispanic or Latino of any race were 3.8% of the population.

There were 1,394 households, of which 36.4% had children under the age of 18 living with them, 49.4% were married couples living together, 13.4% had a female householder with no husband present, 5.2% had a male householder with no wife present, and 32.0% were non-families. 27.0% of all households were made up of individuals, and 14.3% had someone living alone who was 65 years of age or older. The average household size was 2.61 and the average family size was 3.15.

The median age in the city was 36.3 years. 28.4% of residents were under the age of 18; 8.8% were between the ages of 18 and 24; 22.5% were from 25 to 44; 24% were from 45 to 64; and 16.2% were 65 years of age or older. The gender makeup of the city was 48.8% male and 51.2% female.

2000 census
As of the census of 2000, there were 3,017 people, 1,105 households, and 756 families living in the city. The population density was 470.4 people per square mile (181.7/km2). There were 1,210 housing units at an average density of 188.7 per square mile (72.9/km2). The racial makeup of the city was 89.90% White, 2.3% African American, 1.36% Native American, 0.17% Asian, 0.07% Pacific Islander, 1.06% from other races, and 2.12% from two or more races. Hispanic or Latino of any race were 3.09% of the population. 22.2% were of German, 13.9% United States or American, 11.1% English, 7.2% Irish, 5.4% Norwegian and 5.2% French ancestry.

There were 1,105 households, out of which 38.7% had children under the age of 18 living with them, 50.2% were married couples living together, 13.3% had a female householder with no husband present, and 31.5% were non-families. 26.6% of all households were made up of individuals, and 14.2% had someone living alone who was 65 years of age or older. The average household size was 2.69 and the average family size was 3.24.

In the city, the age distribution of the population shows 32.5% under the age of 18, 7.3% from 18 to 24, 27.5% from 25 to 44, 18.0% from 45 to 64, and 14.7% who were 65 years of age or older. The median age was 34 years. For every 100 females, there were 91.1 males. For every 100 females age 18 and over, there were 83.8 males.

The median income for a household in the city was $32,470, and the median income for a family was $37,820. Males had a median income of $36,326 versus $19,825 for females. The per capita income for the city was $17,132. About 10.8% of families and 15.1% of the population were below the poverty line, including 17.5% of those under age 18 and 21.3% of those age 65 or over.

Education
The Deer Park School District is in surrounded by the Newport School District, Mary Walker School District, Riverside School District and the Mead School District.

Transportation
Deer Park is served by the Spokane Transit Authority, which operates bus services in Spokane County. Deer Park also has an airport located three nautical miles northeast, Deer Park Airport. This airport was previous known as Deer Park Municipal Airport.

Notable people 

 Gail M. Kelly, anthropologist
 Bob Lewis, member of the Washington State Senate
 Howie Slater, NFL fullback
 John Swiderski, video game designer and founder of Mean Hamster Software
 Judy Warnick, member of the Washington State Senate

See also 

 Deer Park Tribune

References

External links
 

Cities in Washington (state)
Cities in Spokane County, Washington